Kalus-e Olya (also Romanized as Kālūs-e ‘Olyā; also known as Sar Dasht-e Kālūs) is a village in Sarrud-e Jonubi Rural District, in the Central District of Boyer-Ahmad County, Kohgiluyeh and Boyer-Ahmad Province, Iran.

Census
At the 2006 census, its population was 103, in 22 families.

References 

Populated places in Boyer-Ahmad County